Intan Erlita Novianti (born in Jakarta, 23 November 1980) is an Indonesian psychologist and television presenter

She started her career as catwalk model in 2000. In 2002, she moved to broadcast as TV presenter. In 2006 she became a presenter of WWE Raw for Lativi.

In 2007, Intan moved to GlobalTV to present a quiz segment in Formula One and AFC Asian Cup. And in 2008 she presented a quiz in F1 alongside Hilbram Dunar.

Outside of her career in TV, her hobbies are shopping, and reading. In 2004 she married Rikrik Partadinata, and they have two sons and two daughters.

References

1980 births
Living people
People from Jakarta
Indonesian television presenters
Indonesian women television presenters
Indonesian sports announcers